Jayadev, Jayadeva, or Jayadeb may refer to:

Jayadeva (born c. 1170), a Sanskrit poet
Jayadev (Odisha Vidhan Sabha constituency)
Jayadeb, a 1962 Odia film about Jayadeva
Jayadev (film), a 2017 Telugu film by Jayanth C. Paranjee

People
Jayadev Misra, American computer scientist 
Jayadev Mohan, Indian actor and director 
Galla Jayadev, Indian politician and industrialist
Raj Jayadev (born 1975), American community organiser and criminal justice advocate

See also
Kavi Joydev, a 1941 Bengali film about Jayadeva by Jiben Bose
Sri Jayadev College of Pharmaceutical Sciences in India